The 1983 Swedish Open was a men's tennis tournament played on outdoor clay courts held in Båstad, Sweden and was part of the Grand Prix circuit of the 1983 Tour. It was the 36th edition of the tournament and was held from 11 July through 17 July 1983. First-seeded Mats Wilander won the singles title.

Finals

Singles

 Mats Wilander defeated  Anders Järryd 6–1, 6–2
 It was Wilander's 4th singles title of the year and the 8th of his career.

Doubles

 Joakim Nyström /  Mats Wilander defeated  Anders Järryd /  Hans Simonsson 1–6, 7–6(7–4), 7–6(7–4)

References

External links
 ITF tournament edition details

Swedish Open
Swedish Open
Swedish Open
Swedish Open